Damen Rural District is a rural district (dehestan) in the Damen District of Iranshahr County, Sistan and Baluchestan province, Iran. At the 2006 census, its population, including portions split off to form Abadan Rural District, was 14,221, in 2,626 families.  The rural district had 29 villages at the 2006 census. At the 2016 census, its population was 5,929.

References 

Iranshahr County
Districts of Sistan and Baluchestan Province
Populated places in Iranshahr County